Isabelle Balkany (born Isabelle Smadja; September 20, 1947, in Boulogne-Billancourt) is a French politician.

Career 
In 1968, she was a journalist for the newspaper Combat.

She was a member of the Union for a Popular Movement, and then of Les Republicans. From 1998 to 2011, she was general councilor and vice-president of the Hauts-de-Seine general council. From 2001 to 2020, she was first deputy to the mayor of Levallois-Perret, with her husband Patrick Balkany as mayor.

In 2013, Balkany and her husband were prosecuted in court for several charges including false statements, tax fraud, and corruption. After her husband's imprisonment, she was given the post of interim mayor. In 2020, she was sentenced on appeal to three years in prison and was dismissed from her post. The couple were named in the Panama Papers.

References 

1947 births
Women mayors of places in France
Living people
Mayors of places in Île-de-France